Xavier "Xavi" Rey Sanuy (born 13 July 1987) is a Spanish professional basketball player for CB Prat of the Spanish LEB Oro, second tier national competition. Standing at 2.10 m (6 ft 10 ¾ in) and weighing 114 kg (252 lbs), he plays as center.

Professional career
Rey saw action against the Los Angeles Lakers in an NBA preseason game, despite having not yet made the regular rotation of FC Barcelona in the Spanish ACB League.

In the summer 2019 he joins Olimpia Milano for the summer preparation due to the missing players that were playing in the Fiba World Cup; on 24 September, day of the starting 2019/2020 season of the Italian Serie A, Rey receives the offer to stay in Milan for the rest of the season. Less than a month later, he reaches a mutual agreement with the club and, on 19 October, Milan and Rey part ways. He did not play any official game with Milan.

Rey signs with Iberojet Palma in the LEB Oro on 20 October 2019.

Spain national teams
Rey competed internationally with the junior Spain national team, and then with the senior Spain national team at the EuroBasket 2011 prep games. He played in some friendly games but was not chosen to play in the main tournament. He was selected to play at EuroBasket 2013.

References

External links

Euroleague.net Profile
FIBA Profile
FIBA Europe Profile
Eurobasket.com Profile
Spanish League Profile 

1987 births
Living people
Baloncesto Fuenlabrada players
Basket Zaragoza players
Bàsquet Manresa players
CB Canarias players
CB Estudiantes players
CB Gran Canaria players
Centers (basketball)
FC Barcelona Bàsquet players
Liga ACB players
Olimpia Milano players
Real Betis Baloncesto players
S.L. Benfica basketball players
Spanish men's basketball players